Man of Many is an Australian independent digital lifestyle publication and website founded by Scott Purcell and Frank Arthur in 2012 that focuses on men's lifestyle, technology and consumer product news.

History 
Man of Many was founded in December 2012 by Scott Purcell and Frank Arthur as a publication covering consumer product news, technology and pop-culture content. The original concept behind the website was to report product news and announcements but the platform has since expanded to feature long-form editorials, interviews and local news and lifestyle content, on community issues such as men’s mental health and sustainability.

In 2018, the publication announced a rebrand and launched a new website design in partnership with Sydney-based creative agency Canvas Group.

In January 2021, Man of Many publicly expressed concern about the impact of the proposed News Media Bargaining Code on independent publishers in Australia as well as in its formal submission to the Senate Economics Legislation Committee. The publication was also strongly opposed to Facebook blocking news content on its platform in Australia in February 2021 as a response to the proposed code.

In April 2021, Man of Many launched an e-commerce store called the Man of Many Shop. In July 2021, the publication partnered with other large digital publishers in the Australian market to pledge to publish clear and concise messaging to help drive COVID-19 vaccinations.

In September 2021, Man of Many won Media Brand of the Year in the 2021 Mumbrella Publish Awards and was announced as a founding member of the Digital Publishers’ Alliance (DPA) which collectively advocates for leading independent publications in Australia around key industry issues.

In January 2022, Man of Many became the first Australian publisher to sign on with Ipsos, the new exclusive and preferred source of digital audience measurement data to the national Interactive Advertising Bureau (IAB).

In its submission to the federal treasury's review of the Media Bargaining Code, Man of Many argued that small publishers were at a severe disadvantage to the large media players as a result of the code.

In June 2022, Man of Many was appointed as a member of the Australian Press Council. 

In August 2022, the Australian Communications and Media Authority (ACMA) found Man of Many eligible as a registered news business under the News Media Bargaining Code (the Code).

In September 2022, Man of Many became the first digital publisher to achieve a 100 percent carbon-neutral certification under the Australian Federal Government's Climate Active standard.

Awards and recognition 
Man of Many has been recognised with several industry awards. Notable among them include:
 Finalist, Best Media Platform | B&T Awards, 2022
 Best Publisher-Led Advertising Campaign | Mumbrella Publish Awards, 2022
 High-Growth Companies Asia-Pacific 2022 | Financial Times, 2022
 AFR Fast 100 List | Australian Financial Review, 2021
 Media Brand of the Year | Mumbrella Publish Awards, 2021
 Consumer Publication of the Year | Mumbrella Publish Awards, 2021
 Newsletter of the Year | Mumbrella Publish Awards, 2021
 Website of the Year | Mumbrella Publish Awards, 2020

References

External links 
 Official website

Online magazines
Magazines published in Australia
Australian news websites
Men's fashion magazines
Men's magazines published in Australia
Australian entertainment websites
2012 establishments in Australia